The 1986 Paine Webber Classic was a men's tennis tournament played on outdoor hard courts in Fort Myers, Florida in the United States that was part of the 1986 Nabisco Grand Prix. The tournament ran from March 17 through March 24, 1986. First-seeded Ivan Lendl won the singles title.

Finals

Singles

 Ivan Lendl defeated  Jimmy Connors 6–2, 6–0
 It was Lendl's 4th singles title of the year and the 57th of his career.

Doubles

 Andrés Gómez /  Ivan Lendl defeated  Peter Doohan /  Paul McNamee 7–5, 6–4
 It was Gómez's 1st title of the year and the 28th of his career. It was Lendl's 5th title of the year and the 62nd of his career.

See also
 Connors–Lendl rivalry

References

External links
 ITF tournament edition details

 
Paine Webber Classic
Verizon Tennis Challenge
Paine Webber Classic